Giovanni Carboncino (circa 1638-after 1703) was an Italian painter of the Baroque period, active between 1680 and 1692 mainly in Venice. He was born in Treviso, and became a pupil of Matteo Ponzone.

He is also described as a imitator of Titian. He painted canvases for the church of San Nicolo in Treviso. He painted for the Duomo of Curzuola and churches in Istria.

One of his works was donated to the church of San Nicola a Tolentino.

References

17th-century Italian painters
Italian male painters
Italian Baroque painters
Painters from Venice
1700s deaths
1638 births